Andrei Sergeevich Taratukhin (born February 22, 1983) is a Russian professional ice hockey centre and he is currently playing for HSC Csíkszereda in the Erste Liga.

Taratukhin was drafted 41st overall by the Calgary Flames in the 2001 NHL Entry Draft.  He had spells with his hometown Avangard Omsk, Salavat Yulaev Ufa and Lokomotiv Yaroslavl before signing for the Flames in 2006.  Taratukhin was assigned to the American Hockey League with the Omaha Ak-Sar-Ben Knights and in 80 regular games, he scored 17 goals and 43 assists for 60 points.  It would be his only season in North America as he returned to Russia the next season, re-joining Salavat Yulaev Ufa.

Career statistics

Regular season and playoffs

International

External links

1983 births
Amur Khabarovsk players
Atlant Moscow Oblast players
Avangard Omsk players
Calgary Flames draft picks
Ice hockey players at the 2006 Winter Olympics
Living people
Lokomotiv Yaroslavl players
Metallurg Novokuznetsk players
HC Neftekhimik Nizhnekamsk players
Olympic ice hockey players of Russia
Omaha Ak-Sar-Ben Knights players
Sportspeople from Omsk
Russian ice hockey centres
Salavat Yulaev Ufa players
Zauralie Kurgan players